Ihsan Al Jabri (Arabic: إحسان الجابري) (1879- 1980) was a Syrian politician and nationalist.   He was elected as a member (MP) of the Syrian Parliament in 1954 and was the mayor of Latakia in 1937  

In 1930 he cofounded with Shakib Arslan in Geneva the La Nation Arabe . It intended to raise attention and action against European imperial control of Arab countries, and Zionist projects in the region of Palestine.

References 

Syrian politicians
1879 births
1980 deaths
Al-Jabiri family
National Bloc (Syria) politicians
People from Aleppo
Syrian Arab nationalists